Motihar Thana is a thana of Rajshahi under Rajshahi City Corporation in Bangladesh.

Geography

Demographics
In the 1991 Bangladesh census, Motihar had a population of 38,000. Males constituted 55.26% of the population, and females 44.74%. Motihar had an average literacy rate of 84.8% (7+ years), above the national average of 32.4%.

, Motihar had a population of 62,172. Males constituted 53.80% of the population and females 46.20%. Muslims formed 95.91% of the population, Hindus 3.97%, Christians 0.05% and others 0.06%. Motihar had a literacy rate of 69.28% for the population 7 years and above.

See also
 Upazilas of Bangladesh
 Districts of Bangladesh
 Divisions of Bangladesh

References

Populated places in Rajshahi Division
Rajshahi